is a former Japanese football player.

Playing career
Aoba was born in Higashimatsuyama on July 26, 1979. After graduating from Juntendo University, he joined J2 League club Ventforet Kofu in 2002. He became a regular player as left side back from first season. Although his original position is side back, he also played many matches as center back. Ventforet won the 3rd place in 2005 season and was promoted to J1 League. However he left the club end of 2005 season without playing J1. In 2006, he moved to J2 club Tokyo Verdy. However he could not play many matches. In 2007, he moved to Tokushima Vortis. He played many matches as regular player. He retired end of 2007 season.

Club statistics

References

External links

1979 births
Living people
Juntendo University alumni
Association football people from Saitama Prefecture
Japanese footballers
J2 League players
Ventforet Kofu players
Tokyo Verdy players
Tokushima Vortis players
Association football defenders